Iskender Pasha may refer to:

Iskender Pasha (governor of Ozi) ( 1620), Ottoman governor of Ozi
Iskender Pasha (governor of Egypt) (fl. 1555–1559), Ottoman governor of Egypt (1556–59)
Mihaloğlu Iskender Pasha (fl. 1478–1504), or Skender Pasha, Ottoman governor of Bosnia
Iskender Pasha (1814–1861), born Antoni Aleksander Iliński, Polish-Ottoman officer